Frank Marvin Readick Jr. (November 6, 1896  — December 27, 1965) was an American radio and film actor. 

Born in Seattle, Washington, Readick was well known for his evil laughter that followed the introduction from The Shadow radio drama: "Who knows what evil lurks in the hearts of men? The Shadow knows!". Readick replaced James La Curto to be the narrator in the Detective Story Hour (the precursor of The Shadow) in 1930, four months after the launch of the series when La Curto went for a Broadway role. Readick continued to portray the Shadow on The Blue Coal Radio Revue (1931-1932) and The Love Story Hour (1931-1932) before The Shadow was used as the title of a series. This signature line remained intact in The Shadow even after Orson Welles succeeded Readick.

He later played the doomed CBS reporter Carl Phillips in the 1938 radio production of The War of the Worlds. Readick modeled his performance on WLS reporter Herbert Morrison's coverage of the Hindenburg disaster the previous year.

Readick later appeared alongside his War of the Worlds co-star and Mercury Theatre director Orson Welles in Citizen Kane (1941) and Journey into Fear (1943).

On old-time radio, Readick was a member of the casts of The FBI in Peace and War and The Campbell Playhouse. He had the title roles in The Adventures of Smilin' Jack and Meet Mr. Meek, and portrayed Knobby Walsh on Joe Palooka. He was also known for House of Mystery (1931) and A Burglar to the Rescue (1931).

He died in 1965 in the USA.

References

1896 births
1965 deaths
American male voice actors
American male film actors
Male actors from Seattle
20th-century American male actors